is a former Japanese football player who last played for Vissel Kobe.

Playing career
Ogi was born in Mino on May 5, 1983. After graduating from high school, he joined J1 League club Vissel Kobe in 2002. However he could hardly play in the match behind Makoto Kakegawa and Vissel was relegated to J2 League end of 2005 season. Kakegawa left the club end of 2005 season and Ogi became a regular goalkeeper in 2006. Vissel won the 3rd place in 2006 season and was promoted to J1 in a year. However Ogi lost his position behind new goalkeeper Tatsuya Enomoto in 2007. 

Ogi moved to Omiya Ardija in September 2007 and FC Tokyo in 2008. However he could hardly play in the match in both clubs. In 2009, he moved to J2 club Ventforet Kofu and became a regular goalkeeper soon. From 2010, he played many matches for a long time while battling with Hiroki Aratani, Kohei Kawata and Hiroki Oka for the position. In 2016, Ogi moved to Nagoya Grampus. However he could hardly play in the match behind Seigo Narazaki. In 2018, he moved to his first club Vissel Kobe for the first time in 11 years.

His career ended in December 2019, entering Vissel Kobe's technical staff only one month later as a goalkeeper coach.

Club statistics
.

References

External links

1983 births
Living people
Association football people from Gifu Prefecture
Japanese footballers
J1 League players
J2 League players
Vissel Kobe players
Omiya Ardija players
FC Tokyo players
Ventforet Kofu players
Nagoya Grampus players
Association football goalkeepers